Brecksville is a Cuyahoga Valley Scenic Railroad train station in Brecksville, Ohio. It is located at the end of Station Road in the Cuyahoga Valley National Park.

Initially a stop on the Valley Railway, trains began regular service at Brecksville in 1880.

Cultural references
Brecksville station was used as a filming location for the 2022 movie A Man Called Otto.

References

External links
Brecksville Station — National Park Service

Cuyahoga Valley Scenic Railroad stations
Former Baltimore and Ohio Railroad stations
Former railway stations in Ohio
Railway stations in the United States opened in 1880